Surveying in Oceania may refer to:

 Surveying in Australia 
 Surveying in New Zealand 

Surveying